Asa is a Local Government Area in Kwara State, Nigeria. The Asa local government secretariat is located in the town of Afon. The Asa LGA contains several towns and villages which include Ogbondoroko, Afon, Laduba, Aboto, Balah, Eyenkonn, Pampo, Ogele, and Olowokere. 
 
It has an area of 1,286 km and a population of 126,435 at the 2006 census. Islam and Christianity are the widely practiced religions in Asa LGA while ethnic groups such as the Yoruba, Hausa, and Fulani are represented in the area.

The postal code of the area is 240.

References

Local Government Areas in Kwara State